Barry Palmer may refer to:

Barry Palmer (musician), Australian musician, worked with the band Hunters and Collectors
Barry Palmer (British singer), worked with Mike Oldfield
 Barry Hill Palmer, aeronautical engineer, designer and pilot